Abu Dhabi, capital of the United Arab Emirates, is home to various international and local private schools and universities, with teaching in several languages spoken by Abu Dhabi residents. These schools operate under the authority of the Abu Dhabi Education Council as well as the United Arab Emirates Ministry of Education.

List of educational institutions

Primary and secondary schools
Various international schools are located in the Educational Zone.
 ADNOC Schools
 ABC Private School
 Peekaboo Nursery
 Abu Dhabi Grammar School (Canada/Nova Scotia)
 Abu Dhabi Indian School
 Abu Dhabi International School
 Al Manara School
 Al Nahda National Schools 
 Al Noor Indian Islamic School
 Al Najah Private School
 Al Worood Academy
 Al Raha International School
 Amna Bint Wahab
 Ashbal Al Quds Private School
 Asian International Private School
 Bedayati Nursery
 Bright Kids Nursery
 Bright Riders School
 Brighton College Abu Dhabi
 Canadian International School (CIS)
 Emirates Private School
 Emirates Future Internarional Academy
 Giggles English School, Kindergarten & Nursery
 Landus Public School
 The American Community School of Abu Dhabi
 The American International School in Abu Dhabi
 British International School, Abu Dhabi
 The British School - Al Khubairat
 The Cambridge High School
 First Steps School Nursery
 The German School Abu Dhabi
 Indian Islahi Islamic School
 International Academic School, Abu Dhabi
 International Community School
 International School of Choueifat, Abu Dhabi 
 Islamia English School
 Our Own English High School
 Pioneers International Private School
 PISCO Private School
 Philippine National School
 Reach British School
 Sheikh Khalifa Bin Zayed Arab Pakistani School
 Shaikh Khalifa Bin Zayed Bangladesh Islamia School
 Sherwood Academy
 St. Joseph's School
 Noah's Ark Nursery
 Tweety Nursery - Abu Dhabi
 Little Flower (P) School
 Umm Amar Secondary School
 Wisdom High School
Sunrise English Private School
 Institute of Applied Technology (IAT)
 St Josephs High School Abu Dhabi
 Merryland International

Skill development institutes
 Chartered Institute of Finance and Management
Arab Experts Training Institute

Colleges and universities
 Abu Dhabi University
 Al Khawarizmi International College
 Al Ain University of Science and Technology
 ALHOSN University
 Exeed School of Business and Finance
 European International College
 Higher Colleges of Technology
 INSEAD
 Khalifa University
 Masdar Institute of Science and Technology
 Mohamed bin Zayed University of Artificial Intelligence
 New York Institute of Technology
 New York University Abu Dhabi
 Petroleum Institute
 New York Film Academy
 Sorbonne University Abu Dhabi
 University of Strathclyde
 Zayed University

References